Rhachidosorus is a genus of ferns in the order Polypodiales. It is the only genus in the family Rhachidosoraceae in the Pteridophyte Phylogeny Group classification of 2016 (PPG I). Alternatively, the genus may be placed in the subfamily Rhachidosoroideae of a more broadly defined family Aspleniaceae, the family placement used in Plants of the World Online .

Species
The genus was described by Ren Chang Ching in 1964, with about 7 species in eastern and southeastern Asia, including Japan, the Philippines, and Sumatra. , Plants of the World Online accepted the following species:
Rhachidosorus blotianus Ching – China, Vietnam
Rhachidosorus chrysocarpus (Alderw.) Ching
Rhachidosorus consimilis Ching – China (Guizhou, Sichuan, Yunnan)
Rhachidosorus mesosorus (Makino) Ching – China, Japan, South Korea
Rhachidosorus pulcher (Tagawa) Ching – Taiwan, Yunnan
Rhachidosorus siamensis S.Linds.
Rhachidosorus stramineus (Copel.) Ching
Rhachidosorus truncatus Ching – China (Guangxi, Guizhou, Yunnan)

Phylogenic relationships
The following diagram for the eupolypods II, based on Lehtonen, 2011, and Rothfels & al., 2012, shows a likely phylogenic relationship between the Rhachidosoraceae and the other families of the eupolypods II clade.

References

Polypodiales
Fern genera
Taxa named by Ren-Chang Ching